Aviculture is the practice of keeping and breeding birds, especially of wild birds in captivity.

Types
There are various reasons that people get involved in aviculture. Some people breed birds to preserve a species. Some people breed parrots as companion birds, and some people breed birds to make a profit.

Aviculture

Aviculture is the practice of keeping birds (class Aves) in captivity using controlled conditions, normally within the confines of an aviary, for hobby, business, research and conservation purposes. Some reasons for aviculture are: breeding birds to preserve the species because many avian species are at risk due to habitat destruction and natural disaster. Aviculture encourages conservation, provides education about avian species, provides companion birds for the public, and includes research on avian behaviour.

Publications and avicultural societies

Publications on aviculture include books on species which include pets, books on breeding and introductory books for parrots and softbills. There are also periodicals, both generalized and specific to types of birds, with articles on breeding, care, companionship, choosing a bird, and health effects. Supply companies publish catalogs of products for bird keepers.

There are avicultural societies throughout the world, but generally in Europe, Australia and the United States, where people tend to be more prosperous, having more leisure time to invest. In the UK, the Avicultural Society was formed in 1894 and the Foreign Bird League in 1932. In 1973 Aviornis was created, a bird-breeding association present in several European countries.

The oldest avicultural society in the United States is the Avicultural Society of America, founded in 1927. The ASA produces a bi-monthly magazine, ASA Avicultural Bulletin. The ASA is a 501(c)(3) non-profit organization that focuses on breeding, conservation, restoration and education.

The first avicultural society in Australia was The Avicultural Society of South Australia, founded in 1928. It is now promoted with the name Bird Keeping in Australia. The two major national avicultural societies in the United States are the American Federation of Aviculture and the Avicultural Society of America, founded in 1927. The Budgerigar Society was formed in 1925.

The Avicultural Society of South Australia (founded in 1928) produces a monthly full-colour magazine, Bird Keeping in Australia.

Sub-branches

Canariculture
From the common name canary (associated with the Serinus canaria), a song bird is native to the Canary Islands, Madeira, and the Azores. This bird has been kept as a cagebird in Europe from the 1470s to the present, now enjoying an international following. The terms canariculture and canaricultura have been used in French, Portuguese, Spanish and Italian respectively, to describe the keeping and breeding of canaries for some time. English speaking canary breeders are beginning to use the term more commonly.

Psittaculture
The word comes from the psittacinae (Latin psittacinus, for parrot, from Greek psittakos).
 
Psittaculture is a word that has been used in the aviculture community since the early 1970s, to denote people who specialize in keeping, breeding and conserving psittacines species, also on preserving psittacines habitat and public awareness campaigns to save wild parrots. It is one branch of the science of aviculture.

A "psittaculturist" (parrot breeder) is a person who specializes in keeping, breeding and conserving psittacines species, also on preserving psittacines habitat and public awareness campaigns of the threats to the ongoing existence of parrots worldwide.

As with aviculture in the sub-branch of psittaculture, there are four levels of psittaculture:

The specialist pet owner whom keep only parrots as pets, will have dozens of pet parrots.
The specialist backyard hobbyist who keeps a modest collection of only parrots, breeds them on a very small scale.
The specialist hobby farm breeder whose collection has grown so large, needs to shift out to rural farms. The farm breeder is still considered a hobbyist.
The specialist professional parrot farmer derives his/her main income from the breeding, by selling only parrots.

See also
American Federation of Aviculture
Companion parrot

References

External links
Avicultural Society of Australia
American Federation of Aviculture

Aviculture Association of India

 
Bird conservation